The 1993 New Zealand rugby union tour of Britain was a series of thirteen matches played by the New Zealand national rugby union team (the All Blacks) in England, Scotland and Wales from October to December 1993. Twelve of the matches took place in England or Scotland with only the final match against the Barbarians being played in Wales. New Zealand won twelve of their thirteen games, losing only the international match against England – they won the other international against Scotland

Matches
Scores and results list New Zealand's points tally first.

Touring party

Manager: Neil Gray
Assistant Manager: Earle Kirton
Coach: Laurie Mains
Captain: Sean Fitzpatrick

Backs
 Shane Howarth (Auckland)
 John Timu (Otago)
 Matthew Cooper (Waikato)
 Va'aiga Tuigamala (Auckland)
 Jeff Wilson (Otago)
 Eric Rush (North Harbour)
 Eroni Clarke (Auckland)
 Frank Bunce (North Harbour)
 Lee Stensness (Auckland)
 Marty Berry (Wellington)
 Marc Ellis (Otago)
 Stephen Bachop (Otago)
 Jon Preston (Wellington)
 Stu Forster (Otago)

Forwards
 Mark "Bull" Allen (Taranaki)
 Craig Dowd (Auckland)
 Graham Purvis (Waikato)
 Olo Brown (Auckland)
 Sean Fitzpatrick (Auckland)
 Norm Hewitt (Hawke's Bay)
 Steve Gordon (Waikato)
 Robin Brooke (Auckland)
 Ian Jones (North Auckland)
 Richard Fromont (Auckland)
 Jamie Joseph (Otago)
 Zinzan Brooke (Auckland)
 Liam Barry (North Harbour)
 Paul Henderson (Southland)
 John Mitchell (Waikato)
 Arran Pene (Otago)
 Blair Larsen (North Harbour) replacement during tour
 Mike Brewer (Otago) replacement during tour

References

New Zealand
1993
1993
1993
1993 in New Zealand rugby union
1993–94 in English rugby union
1993–94 in Scottish rugby union
1993–94 in British rugby union
1993–94 in European rugby union